ISR Racing (also known as Coca-Cola Racing Team in FIA GT) is a racing team from Czech Republic, created in 1993 by Igor Salaquarda. The team is currently competing in ADAC GT Masters.

History 
The company was created to develop the Peugeot 306 Cup of Peugeot Cup racing.

Later, in 1996, ISR started racing in Super Touring with Audi 80 quattro and Czech driver Josef Venc. The team won the drivers' title in the Central-European Super Touring Championship in 1998 and 1999.

In 1999, ISR started building a 500m² workshop for the preparation of racing cars.

In 2001, the team prepared cars for the FIA GT Championship with Tomáš Enge, Justin Wilson and Antonín Charouz. Charouz also won the Czech GT Championship with a Porsche 911 GT3.

The next year, ISR started racing in Euro Formula 3000. The team also raced in Formula BMW ADAC in 2003, and the Recaro Formule 3 CUP in 2004.

In 2005 and 2006 ISR took part in the Formula Three Euroseries with Filip Salaquarda but they failed to finish any race in a point-scoring position.

In 2007, ISR raced in the new International Formula Master series.

ISR will take over the RC Motorsport team's entry for the 2010 World Series by Renault season.

ISR were not listed on the provisional list of teams for the 2015 World Series by Renault season, and are unlikely to be fielding a team.

Complete former series results

Formula Renault 3.5

International Formula Master

Formula 3

Formula 3000

Formula BMW

Euro Formula 3000 

Notes:
1. - Nick de Bruijn also scored 3 points for ADM Motorsport in 6 races.
2. - Rossi also scored 5 points in 4 races for Hitech Junior Team.
3. - Charouz also entered in 14 races for Eifelland Racing.
4. - Schroeder also scored 1 point in 4 races for Uboldi Corse.

Timeline

References

External links 

Czech auto racing teams
Auto racing teams established in 1993
1993 establishments in the Czech Republic
International Formula 3000 teams
World Series Formula V8 3.5 teams
Formula 3 Euro Series teams
Blancpain Endurance Series teams
International Formula Masters teams
FIA GT Championship teams
Auto GP teams
GP3 Series teams
German Formula 3 teams
Formula BMW teams
ADAC GT Masters teams
Audi in motorsport